Loharu Fort, built in 16th century, is a state protected archaeological monument in Loharu town in Haryana state of India. Fort is part of interstate Shekhawati region which lies on the either side of Haryana-Rajasthan border in the sandy bagar tract.

History 

After its foundation in 1570 CE, the control of Loharu fort passed from Shekhawati rulers to Alwar State, then to British raj who gave Loharu State as a jagir to Nawab Ahmed Baksh Khan, nawab of Loharu finally sold it to Government of Haryana (GoH) in 1971.

Under Shekhwawati State

Foundation 

In 1570 CE, Arjun Singh, thakur of Loharu constructed a mud fort at Loharu and which remain a kaccha mud fort till 1800. Arjun Singh was a descendant of Loharu's founder, Rao Narhar Das.

Rao Shekha, the Shekhawat Kachhwaha rajput ruler of Shekhawati, had originally divided Shekhawati into 33 thikanas, of which Loharu Fort was 33rd.

First battle of Loharu (1671 CE) 

There have been 2 major battles fought over Loharu Fort. 1671 battle of Loharu or First battle of Loharu was fought in 1671 CE between Madan Singh of Loharu Thikana and the Mughal Governor of Hisar over former's refusal to pay the land revenue to Mughals during the reign of Aurangzeb (r. 1658–1707).

Second battle of Loharu (~1770s CE) 

The Second battle of Loharu was fought, some time around or after 1770s CE, between the Kirat Singh of Loharu Thikana and Bhopal Singh of Khetri Thikana of Jaipur State, who claimed Loharu as part of Khetri. Bhopal Singh was killed in the battle outside Loharu Fort, and a commemorative chhatri was built at the place where he was cremated, which is located nearly 1 km from the fort.

Under Alwar State 

The control of the fort later passed to Alwar State.

Under British raj: Nawab of Loharu State 

In 1803, British gave Loharu and pargana of Ferozepur Jhirka to the Nawab Ahmed Baksh Khan of Loharu State, a princely state under company raj, who then converted the mud fort into a pucca (brick and masonry) fort. Urdu poet Mirza Ghalib was married to "Umrao Begum", niece of Loharu's Nawab, Ahmad Bakhsh Khan, and daughter of his younger brother, Mirza Ilahi Bakhsh Khan.

After 1947 independence of India 

In 1971, then nawabs of Loharu, Aminuddin Ahmed Khan sold it to the Government of Haryana. 

In 2021, GoH announced that the fort will be given the  status of a state protected monument.

Architecture

The Loharu Fort is built on 64 kanal and 18 marla, which is nearly eight acres. Present fort was built by Nawab Ahmed Baksh Khan in 1803 to replace the earlier Shekhwati mud fort constructed in 1570. The present fort combines three styles of architecture, Rajput, Mughal and British colonial. 

The Government of Haryana notification about the protected status for the fort states, 
 "The south-wing of the fort contained the Diwan-e-khas (special royal hall) and the Sheesh Mahal or The Room Of Mirrors, which has Mughal/Rajput style details. The central part of the south wing contained a large Victorian style audience chamber and banquet hall. The right side of the south-wing consisted of the Zanana Mahal along with the kitchens. The left side of the south-wing was purely Mughal architecture. The east-wing was executed in the Delhi Haveli style which was considered very fashionable at the time and was distinct from the Shekhawati Haveli".

Conservation 

Since 1971, after being sold to the government of Haryana, the fort remained uninhabited, all of the north-wing collapsed and so did a part of the east-wing. Only the south-wing of the fort (containing the Farukh Manzil) survives in a dilapidated state.

In August 2021 GoH announced that after being given a State protected monument status, the fort will be conserved and developed into a tourist attraction. The details of the subsequent conservation project efforts are awaited by the civic society.

See also 

 List of State Protected Monuments in Haryana
 List of Monuments of National Importance in Haryana
 Tourism in Haryana
 Tourism in India
 Shekhawati region
 Bagar tract

References

16th-century forts in India
Buildings and structures completed in 1588
Forts in Haryana